Victor Bulat (born 5 January 1985) is a Moldovan professional football player. Currently, he plays for FC Tiraspol.

References

External links
 

1985 births
Living people
Moldovan footballers
Moldova international footballers
FC Dacia Chișinău players
FC Tiraspol players
Moldovan expatriate footballers
Expatriate footballers in Russia
Association football midfielders
FC Yenisey Krasnoyarsk players